Ad Flexum may refer to:
Mosonmagyaróvár, Hungary
San Pietro in Fine, Italy